The Gambia Ports Authority (GPA) is a government agency responsible for the governance and maintenance of the ports and port facilities of the Gambia, principally that of the Port of Banjul on the Gambia River. The GPA was founded in 1972  and it is a member of the Port Management Association of West and Central Africa. Ports Authority offices are in Banjul.

Principal facilities include the Banjul Wharf and the New Banjul Jetty and Extension; a container terminal, freight terminal, bonded warehouse complex, oil boom, workshops and a document handling centre. Expansion plans include jetty expansion; a new ferry terminal and head office building; new computer cabling and a new car and truck terminal area.

The Ports Authority sponsors Gambia Ports Authority F.C., a Banjul-based football team of the Gambian Championnat National D1.

See also
Harbor
Port operator
Port authority
Transport in the Gambia

References

External links
Gambia Ports Authority
Gambia Ports Authority, Navigation Information
AccessGambia, Gambia Guide, Ports Authority
AccessGambia, Gambia Guide, Customs and Excise in The Gambia

Government of the Gambia
Transport organisations based in the Gambia
Port authorities
Ports and harbours in Africa
Banjul
Gambia River
Organizations established in 1972